Danmarks Nationalbank issued a 50 kroner bank note on 7 May 1999 – updated it on 25 August 2005 – out of print as of 11 August 2009.

The Danish 50 kroner bill (DKK50) is a denomination of Danish currency.  Danish writer Karen Blixen is featured on the front side of the bill, while the design on the reverse is inspired by a centaur from Landet Church on the island of Tåsinge.  The current version for this bill came into circulation on 25 August 2005.

The face of the banknote has a portrait of writer Karen Blixen (17 April 1885 to 7 September 1962). She is acclaimed for writing Seven Gothic Tales (1935) and her memoirs Out of Africa (1937). The face of the banknote is also decorated with flowers, of which Karen Blixen was very fond.

The image on the reverse of the 50 krone banknote is inspired by a stone relief from Landet Church on the island of Tåsinge

The 50 krone banknote has the word "femti", not "halvtreds" which is the usual Danish word for fifty. Femti is a word used for cheques. The Danish National bank first used it on the 50 krone banknote issued in 1957, and the 1997 banknote is thus the third to use this word. However, on the new banknote issued on 11 August 2009 the word "halvtreds" is used instead of "femti".

25 August 2005 the Danish national bank improved the security features with a hologram alternately shows the figure 50, the Roman numeral L and a flower.

References 

Banknotes of Denmark
Portraits on banknotes